Metehan Mimaroğlu (born 7 July 1994) is a Turkish professional footballer who plays as a winger for Altınordu on loan from Eyüpspor.

Career
Mimaroğlu began his footballing career with Karacabey Belediyespor in the TFF First League, and spent his early career with various semi-pro and amateur clubs in Turkey. In 2019, he moved to Altınordu in the TFF First League. After cementing his place in their first team, he transferred to Adana Demirspor on 19 July 2021. He made his professional debut for Adana Demirspor in a 3–1 Süper Lig loss to Çaykur Rizespor on 18 September 2021.

On 5 August 2022, he joined Ümraniyespor on a season-long loan.

References

External links
 
 

1994 births
Living people
Footballers from Istanbul
Turkish footballers
Association football wingers
Karacabey Belediyespor footballers
İstanbul Güngörenspor footballers
Edirnespor footballers
Eyüpspor footballers
Alibeyköyspor footballers
Altınordu F.K. players
Adana Demirspor footballers
Ümraniyespor footballers
Süper Lig players
TFF First League players
TFF Third League players